D225 is a state road in the central Croatia connecting Harmica border crossing to Slovenia and the city of Zaprešić to the A2 motorway in Zaprešić interchange.

The road, as well as all other state roads in Croatia, is managed and maintained by Hrvatske ceste, state owned company.

Traffic volume 

Traffic is regularly counted and reported by Hrvatske ceste, operator of the road.

Road junctions and populated areas

Sources

State roads in Croatia
Zagreb County
Roads in Zagreb